The Church of Jesus Christ of Latter-day Saints in Trinidad and Tobago refers to the Church of Jesus Christ of Latter-day Saints (LDS Church) and its members in Trinidad and Tobago. The church's Port of Spain Trinidad and Tobago Stake encompasses the entire country. A branch of the church was formed in 1980. In 2021, there were 3,505 members in 9 congregations.

History 

LDS Church missionaries returning from South Africa in late 1940 stopped in Trinidad briefly and taught a congregation. Ezra Taft Benson, a member of the Quorum of Twelve, visited Trinidad during a Caribbean and South American tour in 1955 said a church member was serving as one of the secretaries of the consulate."

In 1974, Elizabeth Anne Rogers, a Trinidadian by birth, visited England and married LDS Church member Emil Paul Dopson while there. She was baptized two months later. They moved back to Trinidad in 1976. She wrote a letter to church president Spencer W. Kimball, requesting that full-time missionaries be sent to Trinidad. The Trinidad government allowed missionaries to enter the country. The first sacrament meeting was held in November 1976. Among the first converts in Trinidad were Lucy Josephine Payne and Blasil D. and Felicia Borde.  They were baptized in 1977 by Daniel Rector and Michael Willis.

On June 5, 1980, the Trinidad Branch, located in Port of Spain, was organized with Errol O. Balfour as branch president, making it the first congregation in the nation. In the mid=1980s, missionaries organized a city-wide cross-country race. In 1987, Frank and Arline Talley, church representatives in Puerto Rico, organized a health fair in Trinidad to teach hygiene and principles from the Word of Wisdom.

Kevin Diaz, chief executive of the Boy Scouts of Trinidad and head of civil service training for the government, visited the fair, learned more about the LDS Church and was later baptized. After he was baptized, he learned missionaries could only stay for short periods of time using tourist visas. Through government contacts, he arranged for as many as ten missionaries to stay for a period of one year at a time, and in special cases, longer. For 14 years and prior to retiring, he was manager of organization planning and development for British West Indian Airways. In addition to work and scouting, he served in Red Cross hurricane disaster relief. For his work in public service, he was awarded Member of the Most Excellent Order of the British Empire. After retirement, he served as first counselor to the president of the West Indies Mission and the newly created Trinidad and Tobago Mission. He also served as Church Educational System coordinator in the West Indies.

M. Russell Ballard, of the Quorum of the Twelve, visited Trinidad on February 22, 1990 along with Charles Didier, a member of the seventy, to bless the land. Seminary and institute began in the early 1990s. Church president Gordon B. Hinckley visited Trinidad on 20 May 2002 and addressed 900 members at the Cascadia Hotel conference center in St. Anns. Prior to the meeting, he met with Patrick Manning, then Prime Minister of the country. In 2006, the church's Caribbean Area was created and included Trinidad and Tobago. On March 1, 2009, Neil L. Andersen, of the Quorum of the Twelve, visited the country and presided over the organization of the Port of Spain Trinidad Stake. Elder Ulisses Soares visited members in Trinidad on Feb. 21, 2019.

In August 2020, the church donated two hundred relief food hampers and one hundred and fifty (150) relief food hampers to NGO Living Waters Community.

Stakes 

On March 1, 2009, Neil L. Andersen created the Port of Spain Trinidad Stake. As of February 2023, this stake consisted of the following congregations:
Arima Branch
Chaguanas Branch
Couva Ward
Curepe Ward
Point Fortin Branch
Port of Spain Ward
San Fernando Ward
Sangre Grande Ward
Scarborough Branch

The church's Family History Center in Port of Spain has family history and other historical information that includes births, marriages and deaths.

Missions
In 1977, formal missionary work started in Port of Spain under the direction of the Venezuela Caracas Mission. Difficulty in obtaining missionary visas and restrictions on proselytizing limited missionary work until the late 1980s. The area was transferred to the West Indies Mission in September 1983. The first eighteen missionary visas were obtained in 1988, which increased to thirty-five a few years later. M. Russell Ballard dedicated Trinidad and Tobago for missionary work in February 1990. The Trinidad Tobago Mission was created 1 July 1991, discontinued in 1994, and reinstated in 2015. The church 34 foreign missionaries, while other denominations maintain between 5 and 10 foreign missionaries in the country.

Trinidad and Tobago is part of the Trinidad Port of Spain Mission, which also encompasses Aruba, Bonaire, Curaçao, Guyana, and Suriname.

As of February 2023, congregations that is administered by the mission include:

ABC Islands District
Bonaire Branch
Curaçao Branch
Gemeente San Nicolás (San Nicolás Branch)
Oranjestad Branch

Berbice Guyana District
Corriverton Branch
East Canje Branch
New Amsterdam Branch
Rose Hall Branch
Rosignol Branch

Georgetown Guyana District
Demerara Branch
Diamond Branch
Garden Park Branch
Georgetown Branch
La Grange Branch
Linden Branch
Tuschen Branch

Paramaribo Suriname District
Gemeente Koewarasan (Koewarasan Branch)
Latour Branch
Nieuw Amsterdam Branch
Paramaribo Branch
Tammenga Branch
Wanica Branch

All congregations in a district are considered a branch regardless of size and participation with the district being administered by the mission.

Temples
There are no temples in Trinidad and Tobago. Trinidad and Tobago is included in the Santo Domingo Dominican Republic Temple district.

|}

See also

Religion in Trinidad and Tobago
The Church of Jesus Christ of Latter-day Saints in Guyana

References

External links
 The Church of Jesus Christ of Latter-day Saints - Caribbean Area - Official Site
 Newsroom: Caribbean - News and Information
 ComeUntoChrist.org Latter-day Saints Visitor site

 
Christianity in Trinidad and Tobago